Camissecla is a genus of butterflies in the family Lycaenidae. The genus was erected by Robert K. Robbins and Marcelo Duarte in 2004. The species of this genus are found in the Neotropical realm.

Species
Camissecla charichlorus (Butler & H. Druce, 1872) Costa Rica, Nicaragua, Colombia
Camissecla simasca (Draudt, 1920) Colombia
Camissecla gedrosia (Hewitson, 1868) Brazil
Camissecla camissa (Hewitson, 1870) Guatemala, Ecuador
Camissecla cleocha (Hewitson, 1870) Ecuador
Camissecla pactya (Hewitson, 1874) Colombia, Bolivia, Ecuador
Camissecla vespasianus (Butler & H. Druce, 1872) Costa Rica, Guatemala
Camissecla melma (Schaus, 1913) Costa Rica, Panama
Camissecla saphronotis (Johnson & Kroenlein, 1993) Ecuador
Camissecla ledaea (Hewitson, 1868) Brazil
Camissecla vesper (H. H. Druce, 1909) Colombia, Peru, French Guiana
Camissecla verbenaca (H. H. Druce, 1907) Brazil

External links

Eumaeini
Lycaenidae of South America
Lycaenidae genera